The Baptist Church in Ukraine is one of the oldest and most widespread Evangelical Christian denominations in the country. Before the fall of the Soviet Union, over half the 1.5 million acknowledged Baptists and Pentecostals in the USSR lived in Soviet Ukraine. Prior to its independence in 1991, Ukraine was home to the second largest Baptist community in the world, after the United States, and was called the "Bible Belt" of the Soviet Union.

History

The predecessors of today's Baptists, the Anabaptists, came to Ukraine in the 16th century, seeking refuge from their persecution by state churches in the Holy Roman Empire (mostly Germany today) and other European states. They were later followed by the German Mennonites and Baptists. They sought to spread their faith to the native Ruthenian/Ukrainian population, so Slavs were invited to Anabaptist prayer meetings and Bible studies.

The first Baptist baptism (or "baptism by faith" of adult people) in Ukraine took place in 1864 on the river Inhul in the Yelizavetgrad region (now Kropyvnytskyi region), in a German settlement. In 1867, the first Ukrainian-speaking Baptist communities were organized in that area. From there, the denomination spread to the south of Ukraine and then to other regions as well. One of the first Baptist communities was registered in Kyiv in 1907, and in 1908 the First All-Russian Convention of Baptists was held there, gathering believers from all over the Russian Empire. The All-Russian Union of Baptists was established in the town of Yekaterinoslav (now Dnipro, Ukraine). At the end of the 19th century, it was estimated that there were from 100,000 to 300,000 Baptists in Ukraine.

Persecution
During the 1920s, Evangelical Christians and Baptists were prohibited in the Ukrainian SSR; they were, to some extent, revived during and after World War II in a Soviet effort to weaken the cultural influence of the Russian Orthodox Church. In 1944, Baptists and Evangelical Christians united in the Church of Evangelical Christian Baptists (ECB). They were later joined by other smaller Baptist and Evangelical groups. At the end of the 1950s, 75% of the believers of the All-USSR Council of ECB lived in Ukraine. Baptists in Ukraine experienced a revival in the 1970s, and are now among the most active Christian denominations in the country.

Under the 1996 Constitution of Ukraine, Ukrainians were given the right to free practice of religion. However, as a minority and non-traditional religion the Baptists have been subject to persecution and discrimination, including being arrested. The Government of Ukraine facilitates the building of houses of worship, and Baptists have difficulties with the local authorities in Kyiv and other large cities while attempting to obtain land and building permits. Baptist leaders have criticized the Ukrainian Orthodox Church (Moscow Patriarchate) (UOC-MP) for continuing to refer publicly to Baptists with the pejorative Ukrainian word  ('sectarians'), and for the activities of the group Dialogue, which Baptists and human rights groups characterized as a front for the UOC-MP promoting hostility toward non-Orthodox Christians.

Migration to North America
In the 1960s, 1970s and 1980s, some Baptists (as well as other Protestant groups from Ukraine) emigrated to the United States and Canada. After the collapse of the USSR, migration and interaction with Western churches increased. At present, there are large Ukrainian Baptist communities in Sacramento and Philadelphia.

Many Baptist churches in Ukraine have sister churches in the United States or Canada, with whom they cooperate in ministry and evangelism.

Organization
Baptists in Ukraine are organized and active in building churches and seminary education. It is estimated that there are more Baptists in Ukraine than in all the CIS countries (including Russia) combined.

Baptists organized the first International Christian Theater Festival in Rivne, which took place in July 2007.

The Baptist church in Ukraine has attracted many young people, and there are now over 20,000 young people enrolled in Baptist universities. Many of these youths are taking part in evangelism and ministry.  A spokesperson for the Southern Baptist International Mission Board has said that "[in Ukraine] the new generation is what God will have to use to evangelize, disciple and train leaders."

The Evangelical Baptists also publish a magazine called The Evangelical Field and the newspaper Resurrection. There is also a newspaper for the deaf, entitled Voice in the Wilderness.

All-Ukrainian Union of Churches of Evangelical Christian Baptists

Nearly 90% of Baptists in Ukraine are united in the All-Ukrainian Union of Churches of Evangelical Christian-Baptists (AUС EСB), established in 1994 at the 22nd Convention of the ECB of Ukraine. Today, the union includes 3 seminaries, 2 universities and 15 Bible colleges, and is estimated to have 150,000 conscious believers, and about 300,000 people that attend church services in more than 2,800 churches, with 3,160 clergy members. The union is engaged in publishing activity and has an extended mass media network. The AUС EСB is governed by a council composed of senior presbyters (bishops) of regional associations headed by the president of the council. From 1990–2006 the council was headed by Hryhorii Komendant. From May 2006 it has been headed by Vyacheslav Nesteruk. The union closely cooperates with Ukrainian Baptists in the diaspora. The AUС EСB is a member of the European Baptist Federation and the Baptist World Alliance.

Korean Baptists
Beginning in 1993, the Korean Baptist Church has existed in Ukraine. As a religious organization, its focus is towards the Korean diaspora in Ukraine. Generally the preachers are Americans of Korean descent.

See also 
 Brotherhood of Independent Baptist Churches and Ministries of Ukraine
 Evangelical Baptist Union of Ukraine
 Protestantism in Ukraine
 Ukrainian Evangelical Baptist Convention of Canada
 Union of Evangelical Christians-Baptists of Russia

References

External links 
Official website of the Baptist Union 

Baptist denominations in Europe
History of Christianity in Ukraine